Pyry Petteri Hannola (born 21 October 2001) is a Finnish soccer player who plays as a midfielder for Finnish club SJK.

Club career

RoPS
Hannola signed his first contract with RoPS in October 2016, 13 days before his 15th birthday. He made his debut in the 2017 Finnish Cup in January 2017. He scored his first senior goal in the same competition, the second of a 9–0 victory over Oulun Palloseura. He made his league debut in April 2017, coming on as a 90th minute substitute for Saku Ylätupa in a 3–1 victory over PS Kemi.

Midtjylland
In early 2017, it was announced that Hannola would be joining Danish Superliga side FC Midtjylland in the summer. He signed a new three year deal with FC Midtjylland in June 2018.

SJK
After playing the 2021 season for SJK on loan, on 5 April 2022 Hannola returned to the club on a permanent basis with a long-term contract.

International career
Hannola has represented Finland at the under-16 and under-17 level. He made his debut for the under-21 squad in June 2021.

Career statistics

Notes

Honours

Individual
Veikkausliiga Breakthrough of the Year: 2021

References

2001 births
Living people
Finnish footballers
Finnish expatriate footballers
Finland youth international footballers
Finland under-21 international footballers
Association football midfielders
FC Santa Claus players
Rovaniemen Palloseura players
FC Midtjylland players
Seinäjoen Jalkapallokerho players
Veikkausliiga players
Finnish expatriate sportspeople in Denmark
Expatriate men's footballers in Denmark